An electoral list is a grouping of candidates for election, usually found in proportional or mixed electoral systems, but also in some plurality electoral systems. An electoral list can be registered by a political party (a party list) or can constitute a group of independent candidates. Lists can be open, in which case electors have some influence over the ranking of the winning candidates, or closed, in which case the order of candidates is fixed at the registration of the list.

Electoral lists are required for party-list proportional representation systems.

An electoral list is made according to the applying nomination rules and election rules. Depending on the type of election, a political party, a general assembly, or a board meeting, may elect or appoint a nominating committee that will add, and if required, prioritize list-candidates according to their preferences. Qualification, popularity, gender, age, geography, and occupation are preferences that may influence the committee's work. The committee's proposed list may then be changed in a selection meeting, where new candidates may be added, or existing candidates may be moved or removed from the list. When the internal process is over, the final list is made public. The list may be printed on the ballot paper cast by voters at the election, or on a separate voter information paper.

Replacement lists
When an elected representative vacates their seat, the casual vacancy in a list-PR system is typically filled by the highest-ranked candidate on the departed representative's list who was not already elected. For personal or party-strategic reasons, this person may choose to cede the place to a lower-ranked colleague. 

Replacement lists are sometimes used to fill casual vacancies in single transferable vote electoral systems. An example is European Parliament elections in Ireland since 1984.

See also 
Electoral alliance

References

 
Elections
Electoral systems
Party-list proportional representation
Public choice theory
Social choice theory
Voting theory
Mixed electoral systems